Leith is a surname of Scottish origin. Notable people with the surname include:

Belinda Leith, British singer 
Bob Leith, drummer in Cardiacs
Charles Kenneth Leith (1875–1956), American geologist
Damien Leith (born 1976), Irish-born Australian singer/songwriter
Emmett Leith (1927–2005), American scientist and electrical engineer
James Leith (VC) (1826–1869), British soldier, recipient of the Victoria Cross
John H. Leith (1919–2002), American theologian
Leith Baronets
Leith-Buchanan Baronets
Lloyd Leith (1902–1974), American basketball referee and coach
Prue Leith (born 1940), South African-born restaurateuse, TV broadcaster and cookery writer
Valery Leith, pseudonym of Tricia Sullivan (born 1968), American writer
Virginia Leith (1932–2019), American actress, starred in The Brain That Wouldn't Die
Baron Leith of Fyvie (1847–1925), British peerage title
Remington Leith (born 1994), Singer in Palaye Royale

References

Surnames of Scottish origin
English-language surnames